The Jewish Neo-Aramaic dialect of Urmia, a dialect of Northeastern Neo-Aramaic, was originally spoken by Jews in Urmia and surrounding areas of Iranian Azerbaijan from Salmas to Solduz and into what is now Yüksekova, Hakkâri and Başkale, Van Province in eastern Turkey. Most speakers now live in Israel.

History
Various Neo-Aramaic dialects were spoken across a wide area from Lake Urmia to Lake Van (in Turkey), down to the plain of Mosul (in Iraq) and back across to Sanandaj (in Iran again).

There are two major dialect clusters of Urmi Jewish Neo-Aramaic. The northern cluster of dialects centered on Urmia and Salmas in West Azerbaijan province of Iran, and extended into the Jewish villages of Van Province, Turkey. The southern cluster of dialects was focused on the town of Mahabad and villages just south of Lake Urmia. The dialects of the two clusters are intelligible to one another, and most of the differences are due to receiving loanwords from different languages: Standard Persian, Kurdish and Turkish languages especially.

Many of the Jews of Urmia worked as peddlers in the cloth trade, while others were jewelers or goldsmiths.  The degree of education for the boys was primary school, with only some advancing their Jewish schooling in a Talmud yeshiva.  Some of these students earned their livelihood by making talismans and amulets. There was a small girls school with only twenty pupils.  There were two main synagogues in Urmia, one large one and one smaller one.  The large synagogue was called the synagogue of Sheikh Abdulla.

By 1918, due to the assassination of the  Patriarch of the Church of the East and the invasion of the Ottoman forces, many Jews were uprooted from their homes and fled.  The Jews settled in Tbilisi or much later emigrated to Israel.  The upheavals in their traditional region after World War I and the founding of the State of Israel led most Azerbaijani Jews to settle in Tel Aviv, Jerusalem, and small villages in various parts of the country. Due to persecution and relocation, Neo-Aramaic began to be replaced by the speech of younger generations by Modern Hebrew.

Not all Urmi Jews went to Israel. Beginning in the early 1900s, some came to the United States, forming a community in Chicago. Others stayed in Iran until after the Iranian Revolution, eventually moving to New York, Los Angeles, and other places in the United States, joining existing Persian Jewish communities. A few moved to Tehran, and remain there into the 21st century.  

Most native speakers speak Hebrew to their children now.  Fewer than 5000 people are known to speak Urmi Jewish Neo-Aramaic, and most of them are older adults in their sixties who speak Hebrew as well. The language faces extinction in the next few decades. There are also a dwindling number of speakers scattered across the United States, as well as a handful in Tehran.

Geographical distribution

Jewish languages 
Jewish Azerbaijani Neo-Aramaic is the term used by most scholars. Its speakers lived in Northern Iran in the townships of Northern Iranian Azerbaijan (specifically Urmia, official name Rizaiye and Salamas, official name Shahpur).  Lishan Didan, translated as 'our language' is often confused with a similar language called Inter-Zab Jewish Neo-Aramaic (which is also referred to as "Lishan Didan").  The term targum is often used to describe the two different languages called Lishan Didan, as it is a traditional and common term for the Jewish Neo-Aramaic dialects.

Another language is called Manuscript Barzani or Barzani Jewish Neo-Aramaic.  Manuscript Barzani was spoken in a community in Iraqi Kurdistan of the Rewanduz/Arbel region.  This language is also called 'Targum,' as it follows distinct translation techniques used by Targum Onkelos and Targum Jonathan.  Most of the men of the Barzani family were rabbis and Torah scholars.  The rabbis would travel around Kurdistan to set up and maintain yeshivas in the towns of Barzan, Aqra, Mosul, and Amediya.  Much literature (commentaries on religious text, poetry, prayers, ritual instructions) has been compiled and published by the members of the Barzani family and their community.

*h has been retained in some words in Barzani Jewish Neo-Aramaic and other communities near Kurdistan. The following displays *h retention. 

This is different from the Jewish Urmia language as this dialect has the voiceless glottal /h/ while Barzani Jewish Neo-Aramaic has regular pharyngealization with the voiced pharyngeal /ʕ/.

Assyrian Dialects 

Another Assyrian community settled in Urmia after the local Kurds and Turkish army forced them to flee their homes.  Over ten thousand people died en route to Urmia.  After additional trouble in Urmia, the Assyrian community left and settled in Ba‘quba near Baghdad. In the early 1930s some moved to Syria and lived near the Euphratic Khabur between al-Hasakah and Ras al-Ain, Lebanon.

The following displays examples of divergence in phonology, morphology, and lexicon between the Jewish and Assyrian Urmia dialects.

Intelligibility
Urmi Neo-Aramaic, at the northeastern extreme end of this area, is somewhat intelligible with Trans-Zab Jewish Neo-Aramaic (spoken further south, in Iranian Kurdistan) and Inter-Zab Jewish Neo-Aramaic (formerly spoken around Kirkuk, Iraq).

However, the local Christian Neo-Aramaic dialects of Suret Neo-Aramaic are only mildly mutually intelligible: Christian and Jewish communities living side by side developed completely different variants of Aramaic that had more in common with their coreligionists living further away than with their neighbors.  The topography in many of the dialects of Neo-Aramaic is so distinct that small villages, (like the town of Arodhin which consisted of two Jewish families), had their own dialect.

Phonology

Consonants 

Most dialects feature a weakening of historically emphatic consonants. For example, Urmi dialect features suprasegmental velarization in historically emphatic contexts. 

Sometimes these consonants can be realized differently:

 // is often realized as [ ~ ] between a vowel/sonant and a vowel
 // is realized as [ ~  ~ ]
 // is realized as [] in intervocalic and post-vocalic positions
 // is realized as [] before //, //, and //
 // is realized as [] in non-velarized words, and [] in velarized words
 //, //, and // tend to be devoiced when near voiceless consonants

Vowels 

Some vowels are realized in many different ways:

 /a/ is realized as
 [] most commonly in non-velarized words
 [] when 
 in the vicinity of back and labial consonants in stressed syllables
 in pretonic open syllables
 at the end of a word
 in velarized words
 [] when, for non-velarized words
 in unstressed closed syllables
 in open syllables that do not immediately precede the stress
 [] when in the sequence /aø/ (sometimes)
 [] when, for velarized words
 in unstressed closed syllables
 in open syllables that do not immediately precede the stress
 /ə/ is realized as 
 [ ~ ] in non-velarized words
 [] in velarized words
 /o/ is realized as
 [] in non-velarized words
 [] in velarized words
 /u/ is realized as
 [] in non-velarized words
 [] in unstressed closed syllables
 [] in velarized words
 [] in unstressed closed syllables
 /i/ and /e/ are realized with lowered onglides and/or offglides in velarized words

Comparisons 
Below is a general comparison of different Neo-Aramaic dialect differences in phonology:

Reflexes 
As a trans-Zab dialect, Jewish Salamas *ḏ has a reflex l like the Irbil dialect above. Examples are:

The reflex for Jewish Salamas of *ṯ is l like the Urmia and Irbil dialects above. Examples are:

Suprasegmental Emphasis 
Jewish Salamas lost the trait of word emphasis. This is the only Neo-Aramaic dialect that has completely lost this trait. Below is a comparison of Jewish Salamas and Christian Salamas suprasegmental emphasis.

See also 
 Jewish languages
 Aramaic alphabet

References

Bibliography 
 Heinrichs, Wolfhart (ed.) (1990). Studies in Neo-Aramaic. Scholars Press: Atlanta, Georgia. .
 Mahir Ünsal Eriş, Kürt Yahudileri - Din, Dil, Tarih, (Kurdish Jews) In Turkish, Kalan Publishing, Ankara, 2006
 Maclean, Arthur John (1895). Grammar of the dialects of vernacular Syriac: as spoken by the Eastern Syrians of Kurdistan, north-west Persia, and the Plain of Mosul: with notices of the vernacular of the Jews of Azerbaijan and of Zakhu near Mosul. Cambridge University Press, London.

External links 
 The Nash Didan site (Hebrew) and Hebrew - Lishan Didan translator.
 Hebrew - Lishan Didan translator in the Nash Didan site

Languages of Iran
Languages of Israel
Languages of Turkey
Jewish Northeastern Neo-Aramaic dialects
Endangered Afroasiatic languages
Languages of Kurdistan